Pachyrhynchus infernalis is a weevil species in the family Curculionidae. It is a small black weevil known by its particularly resistant carapace.

References 

Brentidae
Beetles described in 1879